Rianti Rhiannon Cartwright (born 22 September 1983) is an Indonesian actress, model, presenter and VJ. She's best known for her leading role as 'Aisha' in a romantic religious Indonesian hit movie Ayat-Ayat Cinta (Verses of Love) in 2008 and become a VJ for MTV Indonesia since 2005.

Early life
Cartwright was born in Bandung, West Java, to a Welsh father and a Sundanese mother. She has one older brother. Cartwright was born a Muslim and is trilingual (Indonesian, Sundanese and English). At the age of five her family moved to the UK until her teens, when they moved back to Indonesia. She later attended Bandung International School. Cartwright graduated from University of Tasmania with a Bachelor of Commerce majoring in International Business and Marketing.

Cartwright has also been an editor for Maxx-M magazine, a local magazine in Bandung.

Conversion to Roman Catholicism

On September 17, 2010, Rianti secretly married to an ancient singer whose descendants are U.S. citizens of Batak origin, Cassanova Alfonso, at Saint Patrick's Cathedral, New York City, United States. Two weeks before departure to the United States to get married, Rianti left the Muslim faith to become a baptized Catholic with the name Sophia Rianti Rhiannon Cartwright.

Cartwright and Nainggolan have one daughter: Cara Rose Kanaya, born on July 25, 2020.

Career
Cartwright started her career at the age of 16 in modelling before she turned her attention to acting.

Cartwright had appeared in many films including Eiffel I'm in Love, Jomblo, Pesan Dari Surga in 2006, and D'Bijis in 2007 along with Indonesian famous actors, Tora Sudiro and Indra Birowo.

Cartwright has been named as an ambassador for AIDS and campaigned towards the younger generation to stay away from the risk of contacting the HIV virus.

She served as one of the Judges in popular Indonesian television show "Indonesia Mencari Bakat", a talent show modeled after Britain's Got Talent.

She also runs her own spa and cafe business.

Video Clips

References

1983 births
Actresses from West Java
Converts to Roman Catholicism
Converts to Roman Catholicism from Islam
Indonesian former Muslims
Indo people
Indonesian female models
Indonesian film actresses
Indonesian Roman Catholics
Indonesian television actresses
Indonesian television presenters
Indonesian people of British descent
Indonesian people of Welsh descent
People from Bandung
Living people
Sundanese people
People from West Bandung Regency
University of Tasmania alumni
VJs (media personalities)
21st-century Indonesian actresses
Indonesian women television presenters